Suffolk was a constituency of the European Parliament located in the United Kingdom, electing one Member of the European Parliament by the first-past-the-post electoral system. Created in 1979 for the first elections to the European Parliament, it was abolished in 1994 and succeeded by the constituencies of Suffolk and South West Norfolk, Essex North and Suffolk South and Cambridgeshire.

Boundaries

On its creation in 1979, it consisted of the parliamentary constituencies of Bury St Edmunds, Eye, Harwich, Ipswich, Lowestoft and Sudbury and Woodbridge.

After the 1984 boundary changes based on the new UK parliamentary constituencies created in 1983, it consisted of the constituencies of Bury St. Edmunds, Central Suffolk, Ipswich, South East Cambridgeshire, South Suffolk, Suffolk Coastal and Waveney. South East Cambridgeshire had previously been part of Cambridge and Bedfordshire North, while Harwich was now part of Essex North East.

The constituency was abolished in 1994. Bury St Edmunds, Central Suffolk, Ipswich, Suffolk Coastal and Waveney became part of the new European constituency of Suffolk and South West Norfolk. South East Cambridgeshire was transferred to Cambridgeshire, and Suffolk South to Essex North and Suffolk South.

MEPs

Election results

References

External links
 David Boothroyd's United Kingdom Election Results

European Parliament constituencies in England (1979–1999)
Politics of Suffolk
1979 establishments in England
1994 disestablishments in England
Constituencies established in 1979
Constituencies disestablished in 1994